"The Bookkeeper's Wife" is a short story by Willa Cather. It was first published in Century in May 1916.

Plot summary
Percy Bixby, a bookkeeper, steals money from his company to pretend he earns $50 a week and seduce Stella Brown. Once, he visits her and they talk about their honeymoon; she seems pleased. She will marry him instead of Charles Gaygreen, who is wealthier.

Later, the new boss at his company notices Percy doesn't take holidays, and shies away from him. Percy ends up admitting he stole money before getting married. Back home, his wife wants to go to the theatre and he explains what has happened. She says she will take up work in Charles Greengay's company and stay with the Burks. Finally, Percy has moved into a boarding house and tells his boss he can pay him less for the debt to be paid back more quickly, as he doesn't need as much money any more.

Characters
Percy Bixby, a bookkeeper.
Stella Brown
Mrs Brown, Stella's mother.
Charles Greengay, a businessman.
Oliver Remsey, Junior, Percy's new boss.
Mrs Remsey, Oliver Remsey Junior's mother.
Mr Melton, a lawyer.
The Burks, friends of Stella's.

Major themes
Marriage

References to other works
Percy is said to be reading James Bryce's The American Commonwealth.

Literary significance and criticism
It has been noted that the story was influenced by John Bunyan's Pilgrim's Progress.

The story has been singled out for portraying a "new woman", that is one who is financially independent.

Other critics have dismissed it as it was only written by Cather to earn money.

References

External links
Full Text at the Willa Cather Archive

1916 short stories
Short stories by Willa Cather
Works originally published in The Century Magazine
The Century Company books